Atlántida Sport Club is a Paraguayan football (soccer) club from the neighbourhood of Barrio Obrero, in Asunción. The club was founded in Dec 23, 1906 and plays in the Paraguayan Tercera División since the 2013 season. Their home games are played at the Estadio Flaviano Díaz.

The club has been playing in the lower divisions of the Paraguayan league for several decades and their most notable achievements are the three second-place finishes they achieved when they were playing in the first division.

History
The club was founded right before Christmas day on December 23, 1906. Its main founders were Flaviano Díaz, Héctor Díaz, Lino Bogado, Miguel Ferraro and Antonio Tavarozzi, being Flaviano Díaz its first president ever.

Atlántida are one of the oldest clubs in Paraguayan football history, but have long been overshadowed in Barrio Obrero by their neighbors Cerro Porteño, Nacional and  Club Sol de América.

Notable players
To appear in this section a player must have either:
 Played at least 125 games for the club.
 Set a club record or won an individual award while at the club.
 Been part of a national team at any time.
 Played in the first division of any other football association (outside of Paraguay).
 Played in a continental and/or intercontinental competition.

Paraguayan players
  Paulo da Silva
  Victor Caceres

Non-CONMEBOL players
  Syahrizal Syahbuddin (2011)

Honours
Paraguayan First Division: 0
Runners-up (3): 1910, 1911, 1936

Paraguayan Second Division: 2
1927, 1951

Paraguayan Third Division: 3
1960, 1978, 1981

Paraguayan Fourth Division:ABC Color (ed.) «Atlántida, campeón» Sept 23, 2012. (in spanish) Asunción. Retrieved Nov 26, 2012. 2
1997, 2012
Runners-up (1): 2007

Another national championships
Liga Centenario: 2
1915, 1917.

References

External links
 Albigol: Atlantida Info
 Paraguayan Soccer Info

Football clubs in Paraguay
Association football clubs established in 1906
1906 establishments in Paraguay